Andalucía is the second station on line K of the Metrocable. It is located in the northeast corner of Medellín, in a community known as Santa Cruz.

References

External links
 Official site of Medellín Metro 

Medellín Metro stations